Tema is a city in Ghana.

Tema or TEMA may also refer to:

Arts and media 
 Gazeta Tema, an Albanian newspaper
 Tema (magazine), a Bulgarian magazine
 The Theme, a 1979 Soviet film

People 
 Tema (son of Ishmael), mentioned in the Torah
 Tema Mursadat (born 1978), Indonesian footballer
 Muzaffer Tema (1919–2011), Turkish actor

Places 
 Tayma, an oasis in Saudi Arabia
 Tema, Togo
 Tema Reef, in the Cook Islands
 Land of Tema, mentioned in the Bible and identified with Tayma

Other uses 
 TEMA Foundation, a Turkish environmental organization
 Tennessee Emergency Management Agency, an agency of the state government of Tennessee, United States
 Toyota Motor Engineering & Manufacturing North America
 The Tubular Exchanger Manufacturers Association, an association of fabricators of shell and tube type heat exchangers
 Triple-entry bookkeeping and momentum accounting
 Triple exponential moving average

See also 
 Theme (disambiguation)
 topic — common translation of same combination of Cyrillic letters
Tima (name)
Yle Teema